MSD may refer to:

Companies
 Merck Sharp and Dohme, an international name of Merck & Co., the U.S. and Canada pharmaceutical company formerly related to German Merck KGaA
 MSD Capital, a private investment firm owned by personal computer entrepreneur Michael Dell
 MSD Ignition, a company that specializes in automotive-ignition components; MSD stands for "multiple spark discharge"
 Motor Sports Developments, an automotive-engineering company based in Milton Keynes, United Kingdom; see X25XE

Computers
 Mass storage device, like a USB key
 Memory Stick Duo, a type of solid digital data storage device
 Microsoft Diagnostics, a computer diagnostic program shipped with various versions of DOS and Microsoft Windows operating systems
 Modem Sharing Device
 MSD Super Disk, a floppy-disk drive for Commodore 8-bit systems
miniSD/microSD

Organizations

Schools and school districts
 Marjory Stoneman Douglas High School, Florida, United States
 Stoneman Douglas High School shooting
 Marshall School District in Marshall, Arkansas, United States
 Maryland School for the Deaf, United States
 Milford School District, a school district in Milford, Delaware, United States
 Missouri School for the Deaf
 Moscow School District in Moscow, Idaho, United States

Other organizations
 Meclîsa Sûriya Demokratîk or Syrian Democratic Council, the political wing of the Syrian Democratic Forces in Syria
 Metro de Santo Domingo, a rapid-transit system in Santo Domingo, the capital of the Dominican Republic
 Ministry of Social Development (New Zealand)
 Mission Science Division, a group of scientists, research fellows and young graduates working at the European Space Agency
 Mladí sociální demokraté or Young Social Democrats (Czech Republic), a social democratic youth organization in the Czech Republic
 Mladí sociálni demokrati or Young Social Democrats (Slovakia), a social democratic youth organization in Slovakia
 Mobile Security Deployments, the U.S. Diplomatic Security Service's tactical unit
 MSD (Межправительственный совет дорожников) or Intergovernmental Council of Roads, the road authority organisation of the Commonwealth of Independent States

Science and medicine
 Macromolecular Structure Database, one of the services provided by the European Bioinformatics Institute
 Major hypersomnolence disorder
 Marine sanitation device, used in the Regulation of ship pollution in the United States#Marine sanitation devices
 Mars solar date
 Mass spectrometric detector, a type of chromatography detector
 Mean squared displacement, a statistical measure of random motion
 Multiple sulfatase deficiency, a very rare form of metachromatic leukodystrophy
 Musculoskeletal disorders

Other uses
 Magnetic switchable device, a passive magnetic mount that can be activated or deactivated
 Mahendra Singh Dhoni or MSD (born 1981), Indian cricketer
 Master Scuba Diver, a certification level in recreational scuba diving
 Master of Science in Dentistry, a Dental degree
 Master of Sport Directorship (MSD) at Manchester Metropolitan University
 Mean Shortest Distance, in the context of the PGP Web of trust
 Minimum string distance, the number of insertions, deletions, or substitutions to transform one string into another in Typing#Minimum string distance error rate
 Moorside railway station, England National Rail station code
 Moscow Summer Time
 Most significant digit